Animation International Ltd. is a company headquartered in Hong Kong. The company was established in 1979 and  focuses on film distribution, publishing and licensing. They export and license animation in China, Hong Kong, the Middle East, Southeast Asia (including the Philippines) and Taiwan. In 1996 they established Animation International (Thailand) Co., Ltd. as a joint venture with JSL Co., Ltd. The company announced plans to establish places for products related to the Doraemon franchise in electronics stores and in some Laox stores as well as a dedicated store which is supposed to open in 2013.

References

External links
 

Entertainment companies of Hong Kong
Anime companies
Entertainment companies established in 1979